Academic-historical research into Jewish mysticism is a modern multi-discipline university branch of Jewish studies. It studies the texts and historical contexts of Judaic mysticism using objective historical-critical methods of Religious studies, such as Philology, History of ideas, Social history and Phenomenology. The historical development of Jewish mysticism under study covers the range of phases, forms and expressions, from early Rabbinic Merkabah mysticism, through Medieval Hasidei Ashkenaz and Classical Kabbalah, early-modern Safed Kabbalah and Sabbateanism, to modern Hasidism and 20th century expressions. It is often seen as a parallel field to academic research into rationalist Jewish philosophy, though some scholars contribute in both areas. In Israel both subjects, together with Ethical literature, share the umbrella department of Jewish thought.

Historical research into Jewish mysticism was first prepared by the 19th century Wissenschaft des Judentums school, whose historiography ignored, opposed or downplayed Kabbalah. The founding of the present flourishing University discipline is attributed to Gershom Scholem and his school in the Hebrew University of Jerusalem in the 20th century, whose historiography positioned Jewish mysticism as a mainstream vitalising source in the centre of Jewish development. A second generation of scholars are today found in Israel, the United States and Europe. The field is broadly divided into three camps:
 Professors/researchers of Jewish mysticism/thought in academia, who study Jewish mysticism through its internal textual development
 Professors/researchers of Jewish history/society in academia, who contribute to the study of Jewish mysticism through its external social contexts
 Independent historian researchers outside of Universities, who follow a religious historiography, but use the scholarly academic apparatus of research, sourcing and presentation. This research is most common in relation to Hasidism, due to its social popularisation of Kabbalah. These works are not usually cited in the critical-methodology of academia, but work is being done to examine their findings

Spiritual figures within the Jewish mystical tradition are not listed here, but in Timeline List of Jewish Kabbalists. Contemporary teachers of Jewish mysticism across the Jewish denominations, listed there, should only be listed here if they also publish scholarly-form historical research into Jewish mysticism. Academic scholars of Jewish mysticism have followed a diverse range in personal belief commitment or detachment to Jewish mysticism, independent of their research.

Prelude historians of Judaism before Scholem 

 Heinrich Graetz (1817–1891) (Wissenschaft des Judentums, disparaged Kabbalah)
 Jewish Encyclopedia 1901-1906 (Wissenschaft des Judentums)
 Simon Dubnow (1860–1941) (historian and folkist ideologue, initial Hasidism history)
 Moses Gaster (1856–1939) (folklorist)
 Isaac Broyde (1867–1922) (author of Jewish Encyclopedia articles)
 Adolf Jellinek (1821–1893) (Austrian Rabbi and scholar)

Academic scholars of Jewish mysticism/thought

Israel 
 Gershom Scholem (1897–1982) (Founder of academic discipline, Hebrew University, new historiography represented in Encyclopaedia Judaica 1971–1972)
 Martin Buber (1878–1965) (Interpretation of Hasidism to his own Existentialist Philosophy, Hebrew University, founder of Neo-Hasidism)
 Joseph Dan (1935–2022) (Scholem chair at Hebrew University)
 Moshe Idel (1947-) (revision of Scholem's views and Ecstatic Kabbalah)
 Rachel Elior (1949-) (Hebrew University)
 Jonathan Garb (1967-) (Hebrew University)
 Boaz Huss (1959-) (Ben Gurion University)

United States 
 Abraham Joshua Heschel (1907–1972) (Neo-Hasidic philosopher and theologian, Jewish Theological Seminary)
 Alexander Altmann (1906–1987) (a founding figure in US, also scholar of Jewish philosophy, taught Brandeis University)
 Elliot Wolfson (1956-) (University of California, Santa Barbara)
 Arthur Green (1941-) (Hasidism scholar, also Reconstructionist/Neo-Hasidic theologian, Hebrew College, Boston)
 Norman Lamm (1927–2020) (Modern Orthodox leader, Hasidic-Mitnagdic study, Yeshiva University)
 Allan Nadler (1954-) (Mitnagdic response to Hasidism)
 Daniel C. Matt (academic translation of the Zohar)
 Shaul Magid (Indiana University)

Europe 
 Louis Jacobs (1920–2006) (London, Hasidic studies, Conservative Judaism theologian)
George Vajda (Medieval Kabbalah)

Religious historiography researchers of Jewish mysticism

Israel

United States 
Aryeh Kaplan (Meditation and the Prophets, Kabbalistic Meditation, Breslov Hasidic history)
Jacob Immanuel Schochet (Habad Hasidic history)
Nathaniel Deutsch (Kabbalah, Merkabah and Hasisdism)

Europe

Elsewhere

See also 
 Jewish studies (surveys each university)
 Jewish thought
 Jewish mysticism
 Religious studies
 Historiography
 Gershom Scholem
 List of Jewish Kabbalists

References

External links 

Don Karr's Bibliographic Surveys of contemporary historian scholarship on all traditions in Jewish mysticism

Hasidic Judaism
Judaic studies
Jewish historians
Mysticism academics
Religious studies scholars
Lists of theologians and religious studies scholars